The Atlanta Heartbreakers are a team of the Women's Spring Football League which began play for the 2011 season.  Based in Atlanta, Georgia, home games are played on the campus of Pebblebrook High School in nearby Mableton. They were members of the Women's Football Alliance for their inaugural season before leaving for the WSFL for the 2013 season.

Season-By-Season

|-
|2011 || 4 || 4 || 0 || 1st National Atlantic || Lost National Conference Quarterfinal (Indy)
|-
|2013 || 0 || 3 || 0 || 4th League || --
|-
|2014 || 0 || 4 || 0 || 3rd East || --
|-
|2015 || 0 || 6 || 0 || 4th South || --
|-
!Totals || 4 || 18 || 0
|colspan="2"| (including playoffs)

2011

Standings

Season Schedule

References

Atlanta Heartbreakers official website

Women's Spring Football League teams
American football teams in Georgia (U.S. state)
Sports teams in Atlanta
American football teams established in 2010
2010 establishments in Georgia (U.S. state)
Women's sports in Georgia (U.S. state)